Charles Gurney may refer to:

Charles E. Gurney (1874–1945), American lawyer and politician 
Charles W. Gurney (1840–1913), American business man
Charles Raymond Gurney (1906-1942), Australian aviator